Nervia may refer to:

 Nervia (river), Liguria, Italy; a stream
 Nervia (butterfly), a genus of butterflies in the tribe Astictopterini
 HD 49674 (star), Constellation Auriga; a G-type star; aka HIP 32916, BD+41°1544
 Groupe Nervia, a Belgian artistic circle

See also

 Nervii, a Belgic tribe of northern Gaul
 Colonia Nervia Glevensium, a Roman fort in Britannia; now Gloucester
 Cohors I Augusta Nervia Pacensis Brittonum, a Roman auxiliary infantry cohort
 The Valley of the Nervia, a painting by Claude Monet